Phyllium is the largest and most widespread genus of leaf insects in the family Phylliidae (Phasmatodea). They can be found in Sundaland, Philippine Islands, Wallacea, and  Australasia.

Species
Within the genus Phyllium, apart from Phyllium itself, the subgenus Pulchriphyllium established by Griffini in 1898 has been differentiated. With Comptaphyllium and Walaphyllium two further subgenera were described in 2019 and 2020. Since 2021, all three subgenera have been regarded as separate genera. The Phasmida Species File list the following species:

 Phyllium antonkozlovi 
 Phyllium arthurchungi 
 Phyllium bilobatum 
 Phyllium bonifacioi 
 Phyllium bourquei 
 Phyllium bradleri 
 Phyllium brossardi 
 Phyllium chenqiae 
 Phyllium conlei 
 Phyllium cummingi 
 Phyllium elegans 
 Phyllium ericoriai 
 Phyllium fallorum 
 Phyllium gantungense 
 Phyllium gardabagusi 
 Phyllium hausleithneri 
 Phyllium jacobsoni 
 Phyllium letiranti 
 Phyllium longicorne 
 Phyllium mabantai 
 Phyllium mamasaense 8
 Phyllium mindorense 
 Phyllium nisus 
 Phyllium palawanense 
 Phyllium philippinicum 
 Phyllium rubrum 
 Phyllium saltonae 
 Phyllium siccifolium  - type species (as Gryllus siccifolius L., locality India)
 Phyllium telnovi 
 Phyllium tobeloense 
 Phyllium woodi

Gallery

References

External links

Phasmatodea genera
Taxa named by Johann Karl Wilhelm Illiger
Phasmatodea of Asia
Phylliidae